Trakia Economic Zone (TEZ) in Plovdiv is an industrial and commercial area and one of the biggest economic projects in Bulgaria. More than 180 Bulgarian and multinational companies operate in TEZ which employ over 30,000 people. Since 1995, TEZ has attracted over EUR 1.1 billion of fixed-capital investments. Thanks to the achievements of Trakia Economic Zone, the city of Plovdiv has ranked amongst the top three in the category "FDI strategy" in the ranking “European cities of the future 2018/2019 (Top 10 Small European cities of the Future 2018/2019)” of the renowned British edition “Financial Times”. Plovdiv and the region occupy the fourth place in the ranking of the global media.

Industrial zones
Trakia Economic Zone consists of six separate zones.

Maritsa Commercial and Industrial Zone
Industrial Zone Maritza is located in Plovdiv region, within the territory of Maritza municipality and comprises parts of three villages, namely Radinovo, Tzaratzovo and Benkovski.

The area development started at the end of the 90s with number of industrial facilities of foreign investors off the ground, such as Ferrerro, Liebherr and Socotab. Nowadays, the zone adds up to ca. 5 000 000 m2, and is a long-term home for more than 30 of the largest industrial and logistic companies in the country.

The successful development of Industrial Zone Maritza is due to the excellent infrastructure and the important international roads in proximity including the Trakia highway (A1) to Sofia, Bourgas, the Middle East as well as the well-developed road to Smolyan and Karlovo. In addition, the railway line Plovdiv – Panagurishte passes through the zone. The proximity to Plovdiv (6 km), which is the second largest city in Bulgaria, provides the necessary human resources for the activities of the companies in the zone. The connection with the central gas pipeline for South Bulgaria and the constructed 110 kV electrical substation provides the energy security of the companies. Industrial Zone Maritza is located in Plovdiv region, within the territory of Maritza municipality and comprises parts of three villages, namely Radinovo, Tzaratzovo and Benkovski.

Location: 6 km from Plovdiv City Center

Area: 5 000 000 sq.m.

Industries: Engineering, Electronics, Food, Logistics

Large Companies: Liebherr, Socotab, Latecoere, Schneider Electric, Sensata, Osram, DB Schenker, Maxcom, TED

Rakovski Industrial Zone
Industrial zone Rakovski is located in the region of Plovdiv, near the village of Stryama and on the territory of Rakovski Municipality.

Today, about 85% of the area is already occupied by a number of large industrial investors in the logistic and production sector such as Kaufland Bulgaria, ABB Bulgaria, Ixetic, Zobele, Fine Jarsey, “Brunata” and many others.

Location: 14 km from Plovdiv City Center and 4 km from Trakia Highway

Area: 1 000 000 sq.m.

Industries: Automotive, Chemistry, Textile, Logistics, Food, Energy equipment

Large Companies: ABB, Magna International, Kaufland, Zobele, William Hughs, Brunata

Kuklen Industrial and Commercial Zone
Industrial zone Kuklen covers about 1,000,000 m2, located in the town of Kuklen, between Plovdiv and Asenovgrad.

The Kuklen Industrial Zone is home to the largest non-ferrous metal production company in Bulgaria – KCM 2000, as well as to a number of international companies such as Mecalit, Techni Aktas and Farba.

The successful development of Industrial Zone Kuklen is due to the excellent infrastructure and the proximity of the main Plovdiv – Asenovgrad – Smolyan as well as of the ring road to Sofia and Bourgas. Nearby is also Plovdiv Airport, which provides opportunities for logistics of people and cargo by air. The railway line Plovdiv – Asenovgrad passes through the zone, and there is a stop – “Mavrudovo”, which makes possible the transportation of goods and passengers. The proximity to Plovdiv (8 km) and Asenovgrad (8 km), provides the necessary human resources for the activities of the companies in the zone. A main gas pipeline, as well as a 110 kV power line, passes through the area, which ensures the energy security of the companies.

Location: in Kuklen town and 8 km from Plovdiv Airport

Area: 1 000 000 sq.m.

Industries: Machinery, Chemistry, Automotive, Metals, Logistics

Large Companies: Mecalit, Techno Aktas, KCM 2000, Spinner, Wille Elbe, Fabra

Agro Center Kaloyanovo 
Agro Park “Kaloyanovo” is located on an area of 800 000 m2 and contains several modular logistic buildings with combined infrastructure. The park is located on Karlovo roadway within Kaloyanovo Municipality. The buildings are made of universal modular sections with an area of 2 000 m2 each and the total built-up area of the complex is about 60 000 m2. The zone is primarily oriented towards businesses related to traditional agriculture and bio-agriculture.

20 km away from the Agro Park “Kaloyanovo” passes Trakia highway, as the main road to South Bulgaria and a connection with Sofia, Burgas and the Middle East.

Location: in Kaloyanovo village

Area: 800 000 sq.m.

Industries: Food, Packaging, Chemicals, Food Equipment

Trakia Hi-Tech Park Innovation 
High-Tech Innovation Park aims to be a bridge between China and Europe. It is an important part of the Chinese strategy “Economic belt along the silk road” and is planned as a logistic center for goods from China to Europe and vice versa. Strategically positioned on both sides of the Trakia highway, the park is at the crossroad between Europe and Turkey.

The plan is to build a Chinese commercial center, exhibiting goods and services as well as a modern logistic center for export/import of goods between China and Europe.

Through different models such as online to offline (О2О), business to business (B2B), business to business to customer (B2B2C) or business to customer (B2C), the commercial and logistic center will service clients from all over the world.

Already in the first phase of the project, another 15,000 new jobs will be available.

Location: 15 km from Plovdiv City Center

Area: 2 600 000 sq.m.

Industries: Exhibition and e-commerce modern logistic center

Education and Hi-Tech Park

See also 
industrial-zones, Bulgaria

facebook.com/TrakiaEconomicZone/

linkedin.com/company/trakia-economic-zone

References 

Planned industrial developments
Economy of Plovdiv